Loco Boy Makes Good is a 1942 short subject directed by Jules White starring American slapstick comedy team The Three Stooges (Moe Howard, Larry Fine and Curly Howard). It is the 60th entry in the series released by Columbia Pictures starring the comedians, who released 190 shorts for the studio between 1934 and 1959.

Plot 
The Stooges get thrown out of a motel (literally) by their grouchy landlord (Bud Jamison) for being eight months behind on their rent and are kept outside for good until they can pay him back. Desperate to pay their rent, the Stooges get some easy money by having Curly slip on a bar of soap in a hotel lobby so they can sue and pay back the owner. Curly slips as planned but the hotel turns out to be run by an old lady who is about to lose her lease to the landlord, who goes by the name of Mr. Scroggins. The trio then decides to help her fix up the place and start by beating up the landlord and stealing his watch.

After their usual antics in renovating the place, the hotel is ready for the grand re-opening. The boys put on a big show with famous critic Waldo Twitchell in attendance. Their corny act goes over poorly until Curly accidentally puts on a magician's coat and becomes a sensation and the place is a success.

Cast

Credited
 Moe Howard as Moe/Moe Jr.
 Larry Fine as Larry/Larry Jr.
 Curly Howard as Curly
 John Tyrrell as Waldo Twitchell
 Dorothy Appleby as Twitchell's Girl

Uncredited
 Frances Raymond as Mrs. Brown
 Symona Boniface as Nightclub Patron with Mouse Down Dress
 Bud Jamison as Happy Haven Hotel Manager
 Eddie Laughton as Drunk Customer
 Vernon Dent as Balbo the Magician
 Al Thompson as Dancing Partner with glasses
 Victor Travis as Bald Nightclub Patron
 Heinie Conklin as Nightclub Patron 
 James Millican as Nightclub patron
 Lynton Brent as Night patron with beard and glasses
 Duke York as Night patron

Production notes 
Filming for Loco Boy Makes Good took place from July 29 to August 1, 1941. However, it did not appear in theatres until January 1942, the first Stooges short to be released after the attack on Pearl Harbor.

Loco Boy Makes Good is filled with parodies and timely references. The title itself parodies the expression "Local Boy Makes Good," a generic small-town newspaper headline about a local citizen who has achieved a major accomplishment. Loco is Spanish for "crazy." In addition, the character name "Waldo Twitchell" is pun of the name Walter Winchell.

The Stooges' act is billed as "Nill, Null & Void: Three Hams Who Lay Their Own Eggs, appearing in the Kokonuts Grove." The "Kokonuts Grove" is a reference to the Cocoanut Grove, later the site of the deadly 1942 Cocoanut Grove fire.

Controversy
In March 1946, four years after the release of Loco Boy Makes Good, silent film star Harold Lloyd filed a $500,000 suit ($ today) against Columbia Pictures for violation of copyright. The court found the script for Lloyd's 1932 film Movie Crazy, which Clyde Bruckman had directed, virtually identical with Bruckman's script for Loco Boy Makes Good. Columbia lost the suit. Universal Pictures was later sued for similar violations in several Bruckman scripts, costing them several million dollars in damages.

Quotes
Curly: (storming to the dressing room) "How do ya like that?! Hittin' me with a tomato! And Major Bowes said I had talent!"
Balbo: (chuckles) "A tomato, 'uh?"
Curly: "Yeah, a cowardly tomato, one that hits you and runs!"
Patron: "Excuse me, waiter, do you have pâté de fois gras?"
Larry: (confused) "...I'll see if the band can play it."
Moe: "Start slipping, we start suing."

References

External links
 
 

1942 films
1942 comedy films
The Three Stooges films
American black-and-white films
Films directed by Jules White
American slapstick comedy films
Columbia Pictures short films
1940s English-language films
1940s American films